"Barricade" is a song by American rock band Interpol. It was released as the lead single from their self-titled fourth studio album on August 3, 2010. The song peaked at No. 39 on the Billboard Alternative Songs chart and was their fourth appearance on that chart.

Music video
On August 28, the music video was released via the band's Facebook page. It was filmed at Floyd Bennett Airfield in Brooklyn, and directed by Moh Azima. It consists of Daniel Kessler and Sam Fogarino playing in front of mirrors, while Paul Banks sings in front of a projector.

Track listing
Matador — digital download

Matador — promo CD

Charts

References

External links
"Barricade" at punknews.org

2010 singles
Interpol (band) songs
2010 songs
Matador Records singles
Songs written by Carlos Dengler
Songs written by Paul Banks (American musician)
Songs written by Sam Fogarino
Songs written by Daniel Kessler (guitarist)